The Wisely Series is a series of Chinese adventure-science fiction novels written by the Hong Kong novelist Ni Kuang. The protagonist of the series is Wisely (sometimes also spelt "Wesley"). In total, there are 161 stories about Wisely recorded in 156 novels. Of these, only 150 stories in 145 novels are written by Ni Kuang; the remaining ones are written by other writers with Ni Kuang's permission. Some of these stories have been adapted into media, such as the films The Legend of Wisely (1987), The Cat (1992) and The Wesley's Mysterious File (2002), and the television series The New Adventures of Wisely (1998) and The 'W' Files (2004).

Publishing history
Ni Kuang wrote 150 Wisely stories in the form of 145 novels, most of which have a serial number to reflect the chronological order of their year of publication. There are 11 other Wisely stories written by other writers with Ni Kuang's permission. There are a total of 161 Wisely stories in 156 novels. The first 94 stories (excluding the prequel Young Wisely with serial number 0), were first published in serial form in the Hong Kong newspaper Ming Pao from 1963–92 (with a discontinuation from 1973–78). The stories written from 1992–2004 were published in the form of printed books.

According to Ni Kuang, when he decided to publish the Wisely Series as a collection in the 1970s, he discovered that Ming Pao did not retain all the copies of his previous works. Luckily for him, he encountered a reader, Wen Naijian (溫乃堅), who collected all the copies of his stories published in Ming Pao. He was thus able to have his works republished and released in a multi-volume collection. He expressed his gratitude to Wen in the preface, "These books would not have been published without Mr Wen Naijian's help."

In Hong Kong, books 1–80 were published by Ming Chuang Publishing Company (明窗出版社; under Media Chinese International) while books 81–131 were published by Qin+Yuan Publishing Company (勤+緣出版社). In Taiwan, the books before book 67 were initially published by Yuanjing Publishing Company (遠景出版社) and later by Storm & Stress Publishing Company (風雲時代出版社). The books after book 67 were published by Crown Publishing Company (皇冠出版社).

Ni Kuang announced his decision to stop writing the Wisely Series after book 131 was published. His friend, Taiwanese writer Yeh Lee-hwa, wrote the Wisely Memoirs (衛斯理回憶錄) as an epilogue to the series, and to explain Wisely's life and clarify ambiguities in the stories.

Overview of the stories
The novels are narrated from the point of view of Wisely (sometimes also spelt "Wesley"), the protagonist in the series. They are set in a modern era (1960s–2000s) in a city that is evidently based on Hong Kong. According to Ni Kuang, the character's name was inspired by Wesley Village (衛斯理村) along Tai Hang Road near Jardine's Lookout in Hong Kong. The village was named after John Wesley (1703–91), an English cleric who founded the Methodist movement in Protestant Christianity.

Wisely was born in a wealthy family who run a trading company. Little is known about his parents; it is assumed that they died early. The head of the family is Wisely's grandfather. Wisely is the chairman of the company's board of directors. He lets his general manager run the company and spends his time travelling around the world and solving mysteries. He has several extraordinary adventures throughout his life, including encounters with aliens and supernatural beings.

List of Wisely novels by Ni Kuang

Adaptations
The novel series has been adapted into comic series, radio dramas, films and television series since the 1980s.

Comics
 1984–86 version illustrated by Li Chi-tak (利志達) and published by Sichen Publishing Company (斯辰出版社).
 1984–86 version illustrated by Li Chi-tak and published by Sanyingshe Publishing Company (三英社出版社).
 1988 version illustrated by Li Chi-tak and Yeung Hau-wing (楊孝榮), and published by Morning Star Publishing Company (晨星出版社).
 1995 version illustrated by Wee Tian Beng (黄展鸣) and published by China Times Publishing Company (時報文化出版社).
 2004 version illustrated by Xu Jingchen (許景琛) and published by Yisi Wenhua Publishing Company (意思文化出版社).

Radio dramas
 1981–84 version broadcast on Hong Kong's RTHK. Chung Wai-ming voice-played Wisely.
 1987–88 version broadcast on Hong Kong's CRHK. Chu Chi-chung voice-played Wisely.
 2004 version broadcast on China's GZBN.
 2005 version broadcast on Taiwan's Voice of Han.

Films
 The Seventh Curse (原振俠與衛斯理), a 1986 Hong Kong film starring Chow Yun-fat.
 The Legend of Wisely (衛斯理傳奇), a 1987 Hong Kong film starring Sam Hui.
 A Tale from the East (漫畫奇俠), a 1990 Hong Kong fantasy film. Ni Kuang made a guest appearance as Wisely.
 Bury Me High (衛斯理之霸王卸甲), a 1991 Hong Kong film starring Chin Kar-lok.
 The Cat (衛斯理之老貓), a 1992 Hong Kong film starring Waise Lee.
 Young Wisely (少年衛斯理之天魔之子), a 1993 Hong Kong film starring David Wu.
 Young Wisely 2 (少年衛斯理II聖女轉生), a 1994 Hong Kong film starring David Wu.
 The Wesley's Mysterious File (衛斯理之藍血人), a 2002 Hong Kong film starring Andy Lau.

Television series
 The Legend of Wisely (衛斯理傳奇), a 1983 Taiwanese television series produced by CTS, starring Yang Kuang-yu.
 The New Adventures of Wisely (卫斯理传奇), a 1998 Singaporean television series produced by TCS, starring Michael Tao.
 The 'W' Files (衛斯理), a 2003 Hong Kong television series produced by TVB, starring Gallen Lo.
 Wesley the Young Adventurer (少年王衛斯理/冒險王), a 2003 Chinese television series starring Nicky Wu.
 The Great Adventurer Wesley (冒險王衛斯理), a 2018 Chinese online/television series starring Shawn Yue.

External links
  List of novels in the Wisely Series

 
Chinese science fiction novels
Chinese novels adapted into films